Juan Ignacio Diego Palacios (born 18 May 1960, in Castro Urdiales, Cantabria) is a Spanish politician and member of the Partido Popular. He has served as the President of Cantabria, one of Spain's seventeen autonomous regions, from 2011 to 2015. Diego's PP political party obtained an absolute majority in the Parliament of Cantabria in the regional elections held on 22 May 2011.

Ignacio Diego was elected President of the Atlantic Arc Commission, a multi-national association of Atlantic European regions consisting of 26 political regions from France, Ireland, Portugal, Spain, and the United Kingdom, at a conference held from 31 May to 1 June 2012. Diego (and Cantabria) served a two-year term as President of the AAC from 2012 to 2014. His presidency succeeded that of the French region of Lower Normandy, which had held it from 2008 to 2012.

References

Living people
1960 births
Presidents of Cantabria
People from Castro Urdiales